Walter Berg may refer to:

 Walter Berg (astrologer) (born 1947), British astrologer
 Walter Berg (footballer) (1916–1949), German footballer